The Hochschule für Musik Saar is a conservatory of music in Saarbrücken, Germany and dates back to 1947. From 1994 until 2002, it was named Hochschule des Saarlandes für Musik und Theater (University of Music and Drama Saarbrücken). Since 2012, the rector is Prof. Wolfgang Mayer. As of 2019, approximately 450 students are enrolled and taught by 150 teachers in courses and classes for musicians and music teachers.

History and Location
The Hochschule was founded in 1947 as "Staatliches Konservatorium Saarbrücken," following the model of the Conservatoire de Paris. In 1971, the Hochschule moved into the newly opened building at Bismarckstrasse near the city center. Three years later, a new organ by Klais Orgelbau for the main auditorium was dedicated. In 1988, an extension building was added to the existing main building. Following the establishment of a department offering drama classes in 1990, the Hochschule was renamed "Hochschule des Saarlandes für Musik und Theater" in 1994. After the closure of this department, the Hochschule was renamed into "Hochschule für Musik Saar" (University of Music) in 2002.

Courses and Degrees
The Hochschule für Musik Saar offers bachelor's and master's degrees in the following areas:
 Sacred Music
 Music education
 Early childhood music education
 Cultural Institutions Studies
 Choral and Orchestra Conducting
 Music Theory
 Composition
 Chamber Music
 Jazz and Contemporary Music
 Performance Major (Keyboard instruments, orchestral instruments, voice)

Notable alumni
Gerd Boder (Composer)
Alexandra Kertz-Welzel (Pianist and University Professor)
Siegmund Nimsgern (Singer)
Karola Obermueller (Composer)
Caroline Peters (Actress)
Peter Reulein (Organist)
Marc Schubring (Composer)
Martin Welzel (Organist)

Notable faculty

Tanja Becker-Bender (Professor of Violin 2006–2009)
Walter Blankenheim (1926–2007; Professor of Piano)
Theo Brandmüller (1948–2012; Professor of Composition, Musical Analysis and Organ Improvisation)
Eduard Brunner 1939–2017; Professor of Clarinet 1992–2007)
Thomas Duis (Professor of Piano)
Marc Engelhardt (Lecturer of Bassoon until 2004)
Joshua Epstein (Professor of Violin)
Andor Foldes (1913–1992; Professor of Piano 1957–1965)
Irwin Gage (1939–2018; Professor of Piano Accompaniment 2001–2011)
Martin Galling (Professor of Chamber Music 1970–2000)
Walter Gieseking 1895–1956; Professor of Piano 1947–1956)
Bernd Glemser (Professor of Piano 1989–1996)
Wilfried Gruhn (Music pedagogy 1972–1974)
Jean Guillou (1930–2019; Honorary Professor of Organ 2015–2019)
Bernhard Haas (Lecturer of Organ 1989–1995)

Wolfgang Helbich (1943–2013; Visiting Professor of Choral Conducting 1995–1996)
Toshiyuki Kamioka (Professor of Conducting)
Siegfried Köhler (conductor) (1923–2017; Professor of Conducting 1964–1974)
Heinrich Konietzny (1910–1983; Professor of Composition, Orchestration, and Chamber Music)
Kristin Merscher (Professor of Piano)
Siegmund Nimsgern (Professor of Voice until 1997)
Gustav Rivinius (Professor for Violoncello)
Daniel Roth (Professor of Organ 1988–1995)
Wolfgang Rübsam (Professor of Organ 1997–2011)
Adolf Scherbaum (1909–2000; Professor of Trumpet 1964–1977)
Jakob Stämpfli (1934–2014; Lecturer of Voice)
Maxim Vengerov (Professor of Violin 2000–2005)
Ruth Ziesak (Professor of Voice)
Tabea Zimmermann (Professor of Viola 1987–1989)

See also 
 Saarland University

External links
Website of the Hochschule für Musik Saar, Saarbrücken.

 
Music schools in Germany
Educational institutions established in 1947
1947 establishments in Germany
Performing arts education in Germany